An acroterion, acroterium, or akroteria is an architectural ornament placed on a flat pedestal called the acroter or plinth, and mounted at the apex or corner of the pediment of a building in the classical style. An acroterion placed at the outer angles of the pediment is an acroterion angularium ( means ‘at the corners’). 

The acroterion may take a wide variety of forms, such as a statue, tripod, disc, urn, palmette or some other sculpted feature. Acroteria are also found in Gothic architecture. They are sometimes incorporated into furniture designs.

Etymology
The word comes from the Greek  ( 'summit, extremity'), from the comparative form of the adjective  ('extreme, endmost'). Acroteria is the plural of both the original Greek and the Latin form.

According to Webb, during the Hellenistic period the winged victory or Nike figure was considered to be "the most appropriate motif for figured akroteria.”

See also
 Antefix
 Finial
 List of classical architecture terms

References

External links

Ornaments (architecture)
Ancient Greek architecture
Roofs
Ancient Roman architectural elements